Eduardo Manet (born 19 June 1930) is a Cuban-born novelist and playwright writing in French. His work has been translated into over 20 languages.

Life
Born in Santiago de Cuba, Manet lived in Paris and Italy in the 1950s. In 1960 he returned to Cuba, becoming director of the National Dramatic Ensemble at the National Theater of Cuba. After Fidel Castro supported the Soviet invasion of Czechoslovakia in 1968, Manet returned to Paris, where he has lived subsequently.

Works
 Les Nonnes, 1969. by Robert Baldick as The nuns, 1970
 Eux; ou, La prise du pouvoir, 1971.
 L'île du lézard vert: roman, 1992.
 Rhapsodie cubaine: roman, 1996.
 D'amour et d'exil: roman, 1999.
 La sagesse du singe: roman, 2001.
 Maestro!: roman, 2002.
 Mes années Cuba, 2004.
 Ma vie de Jésus: roman'', 2005.

References 

1930 births
Living people
People from Santiago de Cuba
North American writers in French
French screenwriters
Cuban male novelists
Cuban dramatists and playwrights
20th-century French dramatists and playwrights
Prix Interallié winners
Prix Goncourt des lycéens winners
20th-century French male writers